Stanford Raynold Brookshire (July 22, 1905 – October 10, 1990) was a mayor of Charlotte, North Carolina.

Brookshire served as mayor from 1961 to 1969. He was the longest-serving mayor until 1975, when his immediate successor, John M. Belk, tied him by winning his fourth re-election, though Belk's fourth term would be extended another six months thanks to a change in state law.

A native of Troutman, North Carolina, Brookshire graduated from Duke University and came to Charlotte as a newspaper reporter. He led the Charlotte Chamber of Commerce (as would Belk) prior to becoming mayor.

The Brookshire Freeway, as well as Brookshire Boulevard (both parts of North Carolina Highway 16; the former is shared with Interstate 277), are named in honor of him, and he, along with Belk, is the subject of a book by Alex Coffin, entitled Brookshire & Belk: Businessmen in City Hall.

External links 
Brookshire & Belk: Businessmen in City Hall at GetCited.com
Mayoral biography at Charmeck.org
Oral History Interview with Stanford Raynold Brookshire from Oral Histories of the American South
Standford Brookshire papers, J Murrey Atkins Library, UNC Charlotte

1905 births
1990 deaths
Duke University alumni
Mayors of Charlotte, North Carolina
20th-century American politicians
People from Troutman, North Carolina